Harawira is a surname. Notable people with the surname include:

Hone Harawira (born 1955), New Zealand activist and politician
Joe Harawira (1946–2017), New Zealand campaigher against industrial chemical poisoning
Titewhai Harawira (1932–2023), New Zealand activist

See also
 Harawira Gardiner (1943–2022), soldier, public servant and writer

Māori-language surnames